The Centenary Way is a route devised to celebrate the 100th anniversary of North Yorkshire County Council. 
It was opened by Chris Brasher in 1989 to mark the Centenary of the governance by County Councils.

The route runs across the Howardian Hills and Yorkshire Wolds via Castle Howard and Wharram Percy, linking York and the Foss Walk with the Yorkshire Wolds Way and Cleveland Way National Trails. 

Meeting the Derwent and Foss, the walk combines riverside walks in deep valleys with forest tracks. Part of the route overlaps with the Yorkshire Wolds Way which also ends at Filey along with the Cleveland Way.

Start:  – York, North Yorkshire
Finish:  – Filey Brigg, North Yorkshire  
Waymark: Letters CW on standard waymarks

Places along the Centenary Way
The route of the Centenary Way passes close to or through the following places:
York Minster
Huntington
New Earswick
Strensall
West Lilling
Sheriff Hutton
Terrington
Slingsby
Coneysthorpe
Castle Howard
Welburn
Low Hutton
Malton
Norton
Settrington
North Grimston
Birdsall
Thixendale
Wharram Percy
Wintringham
West Heslerton
Sherburn
Potter Brompton
Ganton
Hunmanby
Filey

Places in italics are slightly off the main route.

Pictures

See also
Long-distance footpaths in the UK

References

Further reading
 The Centenary Way from Filey Brigg to York Minster

External links

Centenary Way North Yorkshire an overview of the walking route

Footpaths in North Yorkshire
Long-distance footpaths in England